Nagole metro station is located on the Blue Line of the Hyderabad Metro. It is near to HMR Uppal Depot, Metro Cash and Carry, RTA, HDFC bank ATM, ICICI Bank ATM and JayaChandra Gardens. Five shuttle bus services from Nagole Metro Station will carry tourists to Ramoji Film City every day. Passengers can visit all miles app or Nagole station for more details.

History
It was opened on  29 November 2017.

The station

Structure
Nagole elevated metro station is situated on the Blue Line of Hyderabad Metro.

Station layout
Street Level This is the first level where passengers may park their vehicles and view the local area map.

Concourse level Ticketing office or Ticket Vending Machines (TVMs) is located here. Retail outlets and other facilities like washrooms, ATMs, first aid, etc., will be available in this area.

Platform level  This layer consists of two platforms. Trains takes passengers from this level.

Entry/exit

See also

References

Hyderabad Metro stations